1911 Schubart, provisional designation , is a dark Hildian asteroid and parent body of the Schubart family, located in the outermost region of the asteroid belt, approximately 70 kilometers in diameter. It was discovered on 25 October 1973, by Swiss astronomer Paul Wild at Zimmerwald Observatory, near Bern, Switzerland. The asteroid was named after German astronomer Joachim Schubart.

Orbit and classification 

With an diameter of 65–80 kilometers, it is one of the largest members of the Hilda group of asteroids, which are in 3:2 orbital resonance with the gas-giant Jupiter. More specifically, it is the parent body and namesake of the Schubart family, one of two asteroid families within the Hilda group (the other one is the Hilda family itself). It is the darkest P-type asteroid with a very low geometric albedo of 0.0249.

Physical characteristics 

In the Tholen classification, Schubart is a primitive P-type asteroid. The Wide-field Infrared Survey Explorer (WISE) characterized it as both P- and C-type asteroid.

Diameter and albedo 

According to the surveys carried out by the Infrared Astronomical Satellite IRAS, the Japanese Akari satellite and the NEOWISE mission of NASA's WISE telescope, Schubart measures between 64.66 and 80.13 kilometers in diameter and its surface has an albedo between 0.0249 and 0.04.

The Collaborative Asteroid Lightcurve Link derives an albedo of 0.0316 and a diameter of 80.11 kilometers based on an absolute magnitude of 9.85.

Rotation period 

Two rotational lightcurves of Schubart were obtained from photometric observations by Johan Warell and Robert Stephens in 2015 and 2016, respectively. Lightcurve analysis gave a rotation period of 7.91 and 11.915 hours with a brightness amplitude of 0.11 and 0.22 in magnitude, respectively.

Naming 

The minor planet is named in after German ARI-astronomer Joachim Schubart (born 1928), who is also a discoverer of minor planets, namely 2000 Herschel and 4724 Brocken. He studied in detail members of the Hilda family, as he developed an averaging techniques for observing the long-term motions of asteroids. Schubart has also been an active member on several commissions of the International Astronomical Union. The official  was published by the Minor Planet Center on 20 February 1976.

References

External links 
 Asteroid Lightcurve Database (LCDB), query form (info )
 Dictionary of Minor Planet Names, Google books
 Asteroids and comets rotation curves, CdR – Observatoire de Genève, Raoul Behrend
 Discovery Circumstances: Numbered Minor Planets (1)-(5000) – Minor Planet Center
 
 

001911
001911
Discoveries by Paul Wild (Swiss astronomer)
Named minor planets
001911
19731025